The 2013 Troy Trojans football team represented Troy University during the 2013 NCAA Division I FBS football season. They were led by 23rd-year head coach Larry Blakeney and played their home games at Veterans Memorial Stadium as a member of the Sun Belt Conference. They finished the season 6–6, 4–3 in Sun Belt play to finish in a four-way tie for third place. Despite being bowl eligible, they were not selected to play in a bowl game.

Schedule

References

Troy
Troy Trojans football seasons
Troy Trojans football